Hard Corps were a 1980s synthpop band from Brixton, London.

History
Hugh Ashton, Robert Doran and Clive Pierce were introduced to chanteuse Regine Fetet, who, having never sung before had an enigmatic, fragile human voice which mated perfectly with the sound the three British sound engineers were creating. Hard Corps were an electronic band that pioneered electronic music in the 1980s and released their first single in 1984 Dirty/Respirer on Survival Records, with Respirer also being released that year on The Art of Survival compilation EP along with bands such as Tik and Tok, Eddie and Sunshine and Richard Bone. A later re-recording in 1985 of Respirer was produced by Mute Records founder and electronic music production supremo Daniel Miller.

In 1985, the band supported The Cure in the UK and Europe and in 1988 supported Depeche Mode in the UK. They were on the cusp of making a real impact and hoped to support Depeche Mode when they returned to the USA, but according to an interview by Rob Doran for The Electricity Club: "However, we were not invited possibly due to British and American Musician Union politics on support bands and reciprocal agreements, but I don’t think there was any chance with Regine’s onstage controversies anyway!"
 
By the time the band released their first album in 1990 (produced by Martin Rushent), they had already split up. Doran went on to write music for TV, radio, commercials and video with the singer from Perfect Strangers, Rod Syers. Ashton carried on with Regine for a while doing PAs and using the Hard Corps' name before becoming The Sun Kings with former Naked Lunch member Paul ‘Driver’ Davies. Clive Pierce continued writing and producing electronic music.

The band is noteworthy for Regine's provocative performances, which often involved her removing her top on stage; an apocryphal story suggests that this may have been the reason for the band not supporting Depeche Mode in the USA. Regine Fetet died of cancer in 2003. A number of previously unreleased tracks have been made available on LPs compiled by Minimal Wave Records.

Members
 Hugh Ashton - synth
 Rob Doran - synth
 Clive Pierce  - synth
 Regine Fetet - vocals

Discography

Albums
1990: Metal + Flesh (Concrete Productions/Pinpoint Records)
2012: Clean Tables Have to Be Burnt (Minimal Wave)
2013: Rarities (Minimal Wave)

Singles
1984: "Dirty" b/w "Respirer" (Survival Records)
1985: "Je Suis Passée" (Immaculate Records) - in 1985, "Je Suis Passée" was also edited as a 12" maxi (Extended French Version, Club Dub Mix) in Canada, UK, France and Germany on Immaculate, Polydor and on Metronome
1985: "To Breathe" (Sonoscope/Polydor)
1985: Jesse Rae / Hard Corps – "Over the Sea" / "Je Suis Passée" (split single, WEA/Polydor)
1987: "Porte Bonheur" (Mute Sonet France)
1987: "Lucky Charm" (Sonoscope/Rhythm King Records)

Compilation appearances
1984: "Respirer" on The Art of Survival

Equipment list
The following are equipment used by Hard Corps on their recordings:

 Roland System 100m
 Roland MC4 micro composer
 Roland MC500 micro composer
 Roland TR 808
 Roland Chorus Echo
 Casio CZ101
 Roland Jupiter 6
 Roland Juno 60
 Casio VL tone
 EMU SP12
 Roland SVC 350 Vocoder
 Roland SDE - 2000
 Tascam 85-16B 16 track tape machine
 Roland D110
 Big Muff Distortion Pedal
 Akai S 900
 Akai S 950
 Aphex Aural Exciter
 Revox 2 track
 Roland SBF - 325 Flanger
 Simmons Suitcase Pads
 Drumulator Pads
 Roland Octapads

References

External links
An Interview with Rob Doran of Hard Corps
Hard Corps at Minimal Wave
Facebook page for Hard Corps
Hard Corps – Rarities at Juno Plus

English pop music groups
English electronic music groups
English new wave musical groups
British synth-pop new wave groups
Musical groups from London